Super street may refer to:
Super Street, an import automotive magazine, published by Source Interlink.
Superstreet, a type of road intersection which is a variation of the Michigan left.